Pterostichus brevicornis is a species of woodland ground beetle in the family Carabidae. It is found in Europe and Northern Asia (excluding China) and North America.

Subspecies
These two subspecies belong to the species Pterostichus brevicornis:
 Pterostichus brevicornis brevicornis (Kirby, 1837)
 Pterostichus brevicornis yasudai Morita, 2002

References

Further reading

 

Pterostichus
Articles created by Qbugbot
Beetles described in 1837